Sir Robert Shirley  (or Sherley; c. 1581 – 13 July 1628) was an English traveller and adventurer, younger brother of Sir Anthony Shirley and Sir Thomas Shirley. He is notable for his help modernising and improving the Persian Safavid army according to the British model, by the request of Shah Abbas the Great. This proved to be highly successful, as from then on the Safavids proved to be an equal force to their archrival, the Ottoman Empire.

Family
Robert Shirley was the third son of Sir Thomas Shirley of Wiston, Sussex, and Anne Kempe, the daughter of Sir Thomas Kempe (d. 7 March 1591) of Olantigh in Wye, Kent. He had two elder brothers, Sir Thomas Shirley and Sir Anthony Shirley, and six sisters who survived infancy.

Career
Shirley travelled to Persia in 1598, accompanying his brother, Anthony, who had been sent to Safavid Persia from 1 December 1599 to May 1600, with 5000 horses to train the Persian army according to the rules and customs of the English militia and to reform and retrain the Persian artillery. When Anthony Shirley left Persia, Robert remained in Persia with fourteen other Englishmen. There, in February 1607, he married Sampsonia, a Christian Circassian lady of the Circassian nobility of Safavid Persia. After being baptized by the Carmelites, she adopted the Teresia in addition to her own name. She became known in the west by the name Lady Teresia Sampsonia Shirley.

In 1608 Shah Abbas sent Robert on a diplomatic mission to James I of England and to other European princes for the purpose of uniting them in a confederacy against the Ottoman Empire. From his very first mission in Persia, the modernisation of the army by Robert and his men proved to be highly successful; the Safavids scored their first crushing victory over the Ottomans in the Ottoman–Safavid War, ending the war on highly favourable terms.

Shirley travelled first to the Polish–Lithuanian Commonwealth, where he was received by Sigismund III Vasa. In June of that year, he arrived in Germany, where he received the title of Count Palatine and was appointed to Knight of the Holy Roman Empire by Emperor Rudolph II. Pope Paul V also conferred upon him the title of Count. From Germany, Sir Robert travelled to Florence and then Rome, where he entered the city on Sunday, 27 September 1609, attended by a suite of eighteen persons. He next visited Milan, and then proceeded to Genoa, from whence he embarked to Spain, arriving in Barcelona in December 1609. He sent for his Persian wife, and they remained in Spain, principally at Madrid, until the summer of 1611.

In 1613 Shirley returned to Persia. In 1615 he returned to Europe, and resided at Madrid. In a pleasingly serendipitous meeting Shirley's caravan met Thomas Coryate, the eccentric traveller and travel writer (and attendant of Prince Henry's court in London), in the Persian desert in 1615.

Shirley's third journey to Persia was undertaken in 1627 when he accompanied Sir Dodmore Cotton the first British ambassador to the Kingdom of Persia, but soon after reaching the country he died at Qazvin, in what is today northwest Iran. After being initially buried there, his remains were later moved from Qazvin to Rome in 1658 by his wife Teresia following her retirement to a convent in the same city attached to Santa Maria della Scala. She died there in 1668.

In art
There are several double portraits of Shirley and his wife in English collections, including the private collection of R. J.  Berkeley and of Petworth House (by van Dyck).

In literature
The exploits of the Shirley brothers were dramatised in the 1607 play The Travels of the Three English Brothers by John Day, William Rowley and George Wilkins.

In 1609, Andreas Loeaechius (Andrew Leech), a Scot living in Kraków, Poland, wrote a Latin panegyric to Shirley entitled Encomia Nominis & Neoocij D. Roberti Sherlaeii. This text was translated in the same year by the English writer Thomas Middleton as Sir Robert Sherley his Entertainment in Cracovia.

See also
 García de Silva Figueroa
 Safavid dynasty
 Military history of Iran

Notes

References

Further reading

  

|
1580s births
1628 deaths
English diplomats
English soldiers
Counts of the Holy Roman Empire
Safavid diplomats
People of Safavid Iran
16th-century English soldiers
17th-century English soldiers
17th century in Iran
17th-century soldiers
Explorers of Iran
People from Wiston, West Sussex